István Péni (born 14 February 1997) is a Hungarian sport shooter. He won a bronze medal in boys' 10 m air rifle shooting, and also shared a top prize with Egypt's Hadir Mekhimar in the mixed international rifle team at the 2014 Summer Youth Olympics in Nanjing, China. Peni is also a member of the shooting team at Újpesti Sports Club in Budapest under his personal coach József Tóth and Edit Kissné Oroszi.

Peni made his first Olympic team for Hungary as a 17-year-old at the 2014 Summer Youth Olympics in Nanjing, China, where he achieved a total of two medals in shooting: a gold and a bronze. In his first event, boys' 10 m air rifle, Peni shot a decent score of 183.5 to pick up the bronze medal in the final round, finishing more than twenty-five points behind eventual Youth Olympic champion Yang Haoran. Two days later, Peni and his international partner Hadir Mekhimad of Egypt triumphed the Latin American duo made up of Argentina's Fernanda Russo and Mexico's José Santos Valdés 10–2 for the gold in the mixed rifle team competition.

References

External links

Nanjing 2014 Profile 

1997 births
Living people
Hungarian male sport shooters
Shooters at the 2014 Summer Youth Olympics
Sport shooters from Budapest
Shooters at the 2015 European Games
Shooters at the 2016 Summer Olympics
Olympic shooters of Hungary
ISSF rifle shooters
Shooters at the 2019 European Games
European Games medalists in shooting
European Games bronze medalists for Hungary
Shooters at the 2020 Summer Olympics
21st-century Hungarian people